yMusic is an American sextet chamber ensemble from New York City. Consisting of a trumpet, flute, clarinet, violin, viola, and cello, the group was formed in Brooklyn by trumpeter CJ Camerieri and violinist Rob Moose in 2008.

Career 
The ensemble has released three studio albums of original compositions written for the group, and has toured extensively with artists such as José González, Bon Iver and Paul Simon. In 2015, yMusic collaborated with Ben Folds on his album So There, and toured with him in support. yMusic made their Carnegie Hall debut in 2016, premiering a piece by Caroline Shaw and one by Chris Thile. The ensemble performs with The Staves on that group's 2017 release The Way Is Read. In 2019, yMusic was credited on four tracks of Bruce Hornsby's album Absolute Zero.

Personnel 
 Alex Sopp – flute
 CJ Camerieri – trumpet
 Gabriel Cabezas – cello
 Hideaki Aomori – clarinet
 Nadia Sirota – viola
 Rob Moose – violin

Former personnel 
 Clarice Jensen – cello

Discography 

Studio albums
 Beautiful Mechanical – New Amsterdam Records (2011)
 Balance Problems – New Amsterdam Records (2014)
 First – Communal Table (2017), music composed by Ryan Lott of Son Lux
 The Way Is Read with The Staves – Nonesuch Records (2017)
 Ecstatic Science – New Amsterdam (2020)

EPs
 The Year of the Dragon (2013)
 A Collaborative EP with yMusic (2017)

Collaborations
So There (2015) with Ben Folds
"Never In This House", "Voyager One", "The Blinding Light of Dreams", "Take You There (Misty)" (2019) with Bruce Hornsby on Absolute Zero

References 

Chamber music groups
Record Collection artists